Quincy, formerly de Quincy, is usually an English toponymic surname of Norman origin, but may also be a given name. For members of the prominent American political family from the mid-17th century to the early-20th century, see Quincy political family.

Other notable people with the name include:

Surname
Roger de Quincy, 2nd Earl of Winchester, Norman nobleman
Saer de Quincy, 1st Earl of Winchester, Norman nobleman

Middle name
Ryan Quincy Adams (born 1993), American rapper
John Quincy Adams (1767-1848), US president from 1825 to 1829

Given name
Quincy Acy (born 1990), American basketball player
Quincy Adeboyejo (born 1995), American football player
Quincy Alexander (born 1993), Trinidad and Tobago track cyclist
Quincy Allen (born 1979), American serial killer
Quincy Antipas (born 1984), Zimbabwean footballer
Quincy Bent (1879–1955), American businessman
Quincy Black (born 1984), American football player
Quincy Boogers (born 1995), Dutch footballer
Quincy Breell (born 1992), Aruban long jumper
Quincy Brown (born 1991), American actor and singer
Quincy Butler (American football) (born 1981), American football player
Quincy Butler (soccer) (born 2001), American soccer player
Quincy Carter (born 1977), American football player
Quincy Coleman (born 1972), American singer and musician
Quincy Coleman (born 1975), American football player
Quincy Davis (born 1977), American jazz drummer
Quincy Davis (born 1983), American-born Taiwanese basketball player
Quincy Davis (born 1995), American surfer
Quincy Detenamo (born 1979), Nauruan Olympic weightlifter and convicted manslaughterer
Quincy Diggs (born 1990), American basketball player
Quincy Douby (born 1984), American-born Montenegrin basketball player
Quincy Enunwa (born 1992), American football player
Quincy Adams Gillmore (1825–1888), American civil engineer and Union Army general
Quincy Guerrier (born 1999), Canadian basketball player
Quincy Jones (born 1933), American music impresario, conductor, record producer, musical arranger, film composer and trumpeter
Quincy Jones III (born 1968), Swedish-American music and film producer
Quincy Matthew Hanley (born 1986), American rapper and songwriter known as Schoolboy Q
Quincy Mauger (born 1995), American football player
Quincy McDuffie (born 1990), American football player
Quincy Mumford (born 1991), American singer and musician
Quincy Alden Myers (1853–1921), Justice of the Indiana Supreme Court 
Quincy D. Newell (born 1976), American historian
Quincy Owusu-Abeyie (born 1986), Ghanaian footballer
Quincy Promes (born 1992), Dutch footballer
Quincy Roche (born 1998), American football player
Quincy Adams Shaw (1825–1908), American businessman and investor
Quincy Williams (born 1996), American football player
Quincy Wilson (disambiguation), multiple people

Fictional characters
 Dr. R. Quincy, M.E.; titular character of the TV show Quincy, M.E.
 Quincy, titular character of the eponymous comic strip Quincy (comic strip)

English masculine given names